Sirena(s) or La Sirena may refer to:

Mythology
Siren (mythology)
 Sirena (Philippine mythology), a mermaid of Philippine mythology

People
 Sirena Huang (born 1994), American violinist
 Sirena Irwin, American voice director and actress
 Sirena Rowe (born 1998), Colombian swimmer
 Max Sirena (born 1971), Italian sailor
 Paolo Sirena (born 1945), Italian football player

Places
 Sirena Deep, a landform in the Pacific Ocean
 La Sirena Beach, Rocha Department, Uruguay
 Lake Sirena, a lake near the town of Lake Placid, Florida, US
 Sirena Aerodrome, a grass airstrip in Corcovado National Park, Costa Rica

Arts and entertainment

Literature
 Sirena (journal), a Spanish-language academic poetry and art journal 2004–2012
 Sirena, a 1998 novel by Donna Jo Napoli

Music

Albums
 Sirena, by Cousteau, 2002
 Sirenas, by División Minúscula, 2008

Songs
 "Sirena" (song), by Gloc-9, 2012
 "Sirena", by Calexico from Convict Pool, 2004
 "Sirena", by Dirty Three from Ocean Songs, 1998
 "Sirena", by Enrique Inglesias from Cosas del Amor, 1998
 "Sirena", by Maldita Vecindad y los Hijos del Quinto Patio from Mostros, 1998
 "Sirena", by Robert Rich and Alio Die (Stefano Musso) from Fissures, 1997
 "Sirena", by Sin Bandera from Sin Bandera, 2002
 "La Sirena", by Maná from Sueños Líquidos, 1997

Television
 Sirena (TV series), a 1993 Venezuelan telenovela
 Sirena, a character in the series Mako: Island of Secrets

Maritime
 Sirena-class submarine, 1930s/1940s coastal submarines of the Royal Italian Navy
 MS Sirena, a cruise ship owned by Oceania Cruises
 Sirena, an Italian frigate

See also
 Sarina (disambiguation)
 Serena (disambiguation)
 Siren (disambiguation)
 Sirene (disambiguation)
 Sirenia, an order of marine mammals
 Syrena (disambiguation)